The Thracians (Thrāikes) were an Indo-European speaking people who inhabited large parts of Southeast Europe in ancient history. Thracians resided mainly in the Balkans (mostly modern day Bulgaria, Romania, Turkey and Greece) but were also located in Anatolia (Asia Minor) and other locations in the southeast of Europe.

Writing in the sixth century BC, Xenophanes described Thracians as "blue-eyed and red-haired".

The exact origin of Thracians is unknown, but it is believed that proto-Thracians descended from a purported mixture of Proto-Indo-Europeans and Early European Farmers, arriving from the rest of Asia and Africa through the Asia Minor (Anatolia). The proto-Thracian culture developed into the Dacian, Getae, and several other smaller Thracian cultures.

Thracian culture was described as tribal by the Greeks and Romans. They remained largely disunited, with their first permanent state being the Odrysian kingdom in the fifth century BC. They faced subjugation by the Achaemenid Empire around the same time. Thracians experienced a short period of peace after the Persians were defeated by the Greeks in the Persian Wars. The Odrysian kingdom lost independence to Macedonia in the late 4th century BC, and never regained total independence following Alexander the Great's death.

The Thracians faced conquest by the Romans in the mid second century BC under whom they faced internal strife. They composed major parts of rebellions against the Romans along with the Macedonians until the Third Macedonian War. The last reported use of a Thracian language was by monks in the sixth century AD.

Thracians were described as "warlike" and "barbarians" by the Greeks and Romans and were favored as mercenaries. Ancient descriptions of a vicious people are disputed and archaeology has been used since the mid-twentieth century in southern Bulgaria to identify more about them. Both Romans and Greeks called them barbarians since they were neither Romans nor Greeks, and to the perceived backwardness of their culture. The perceived primitiveness may be related to their living simple lives in open villages. Some authors noted that even after the introduction of Latin they still kept their "barbarous" ways. While the Thracians were perceived as unsophisticated by their contemporaries, they reportedly "had in fact a fairly advanced culture that was especially noted for its poetry and music." 

Thracians spoke the extinct Thracian language and shared a common culture. The Thracians made cultural interaction with the people surrounding them: Greeks, Persians, Scythians, Celts and later on Turks, but although they were indeed influenced by each of these cultures, this influence affected only the circles of the aristocratic elite, not Thracian culture as a whole. Among their customs was tattooing, common among both males and females. They followed a polytheistic religion. The study of the Thracians is known as Thracology.

Etymology
The first historical record of the Thracians is found in the Iliad, where they are described as allies of the Trojans in the Trojan War against the Ancient Greeks. The ethnonym Thracian comes from Ancient Greek Θρᾷξ (plural Θρᾷκες;) or Θρᾴκιος (Ionic: Θρηίκιος), and the toponym Thrace comes from Θρᾴκη (Ionic: Θρῄκη). These forms are all exonyms as applied by the Greeks.

Mythological foundation
In Greek mythology, Thrax (by his name simply the quintessential Thracian) was regarded as one of the reputed sons of the god Ares. In the Alcestis, Euripides mentions that one of the names of Ares himself was "Thrax" since he was regarded as the patron of Thrace (his golden or gilded shield was kept in his temple at Bistonia in Thrace).

Origins

The origins of the Thracians remain obscure, in the absence of written historical records before they got into contact with the Greeks. Evidence of proto-Thracians in the prehistoric period depends on artifacts of material culture. Leo Klejn identifies proto-Thracians with the multi-cordoned ware culture that was pushed away from Ukraine by the advancing timber grave culture or Srubnaya. It is generally proposed that a proto-Thracian people developed from a mixture of indigenous peoples and Indo-Europeans from the time of Proto-Indo-European expansion in the Early Bronze Age when the latter, around 1500 BC, mixed with indigenous peoples. According to one theory, their ancestors migrated in three waves from the northeast: the first in the Late Neolithic, forcing out the Pelasgians and Achaeans, the second in the Early Bronze Age, and the third around 1200 BC. They reached the Aegean islands, ending the Mycenaean civilization. They did not speak the same language. During the Iron Age (about 1000 BC) Dacians and Thracians began developing from proto-Thracians. The diverse topography didn't make it possible for a single language to form. 

Ancient Greek and Roman historians agreed that the ancient Thracians, who were of Indo-European stock and language, were superior fighters; only their constant political fragmentation prevented them from overrunning the lands around the northeastern Mediterranean. Although these historians characterized the Thracians as primitive partly because they lived in simple, open villages, the Thracians in fact had a fairly advanced culture that was especially noted for its poetry and music. Their soldiers were valued as mercenaries, particularly by the Macedonians and Romans.

Identity and distribution

Divided into separate tribes, the Thracians did not manage to form a lasting political organization until the Odrysian state was founded in the fifth century BC. A strong Dacian state appeared in the first century BC, during the reign of King Burebista. The mountainous regions were home to various peoples, including the Illyrians, regarded as warlike and ferocious Thracian tribes, while the plains peoples were apparently regarded as more peaceable. The most prominent tribe, the Moesians only achieved importance under Roman rule.

Thracians inhabited parts of the ancient provinces of Thrace, Moesia, Macedonia, Beotia, Attica, Dacia, Scythia Minor, Sarmatia, Bithynia, Mysia, Pannonia, and other regions of the Balkans and Anatolia. This area extended over most of the Balkans region, and the Getae north of the Danube as far as beyond the Bug and including Pannonia in the west.
There were about 200 Thracian tribes.

Thucydides mentions about a period in the past (from his point), when Thracians have inhabited the region of Phocis, known also as the location of Delphi; he defines it by the lifetime of Tereus – mythological Thracian king and son of god Ares.

History

Homeric period 
The Thracians are mentioned in Homer's Iliad, meaning that they were already present in the eighth century BC.

Archaic period
The first Greek colonies along the Thracian coasts (first the Aegean, then the Marmara and Black Seas) were founded in the eighth century BC. Thracians and Greeks lived side-by-side. Ancient sources record a Thracian presence on the Aegean islands and in Hellas (the broader "land of the Hellenes").

At some point in the 7th century BC, a portion of the Thracian Treres tribe migrated across the Thracian Bosporus and invaded Anatolia. In 637 BC, the Treres under their king Kobos, in alliance with the Cimmerians and the Lycians, attacked the kingdom of Lydia during the seventh year of the reign of the Lydian king Ardys. They defeated the Lydians and captured the capital city of Lydia, Sardis, except for its citadel, and Ardys might have been killed in this attack. Ardys's son and successor, Sadyattes, might possibly also have been killed in another Cimmerian attack on Lydia. Soon after 635 BC, with Assyrian approval the Scythians under Madyes entered Anatolia. In alliance with Sadyattes's son, the Lydian king Alyattes, Madyes expelled the Treres from Asia Minor and defeated the Cimmerians so that they no longer constituted a threat again, following which the Scythians extended their domination to Central Anatolia until they were themselves expelled by the Medes from Western Asia in the 600s BC.

Achaemenid Thrace

In the 6th century BC the Persian Achaemenid Empire conquered Thrace, starting in 513 BC, when the Achaemenid king Darius I amassed an army and marched from Achaemenid-ruled Anatolia into Thrace, and from there he crossed the Arteskos river and then proceeded through the valley-route of the Hebros river. This was an act of conquest by Darius I, who sought to create a new satrapy in the Balkans, and had during his march sent emissaries to the Thracians found on the path of his army as well as to the many other Thracian tribes over a wide area. All these peoples of Thrace, including the Odrysae, submitted to the Achaemenid king until his army reached the territory of Thracian tribe of the Getae who lived just south of the Danube river and who in vain attempted to resist the Achaemenid conquest. After the resistance of the Getae was defeated and they were forced to provide the Achaemenid army with soldiers, all the Thracian tribes between the Aegean Sea and the Danube river had been subjected by the Achaemenid Empire. Once Darius had reached the Danube, he crossed the river and campaigned against the Scythians, after which he returned back to Anatolia through Thrace and left a large army in Europe under the command of his general Megabazus.

Following Darius I's orders to create a new satrapy for the Achaemenid Empire in the Balkans, Megabazus forced the Greek cities who had refused to submit to the Achaemenid Empire, starting with Perinthus, after which led military campaigns throughout Thrace to impose Achaemenid rule over every city and tribe in the area. With the help of Thracian guides, Megabazus was able to conquer Paeonia up to but not including the area of Lake Prasias, and he gave the lands of the Paeonians inhabiting these regions up to the Lake Prasias to Thracians loyal to the Achaemenid Empire. The last endeavours of Megabazus included his the conquest of the area between the Strymon and Axius rivers, and at the end of his campaign, the king of Macedonia, Amyntas I, accepted to become a vassal of the Achaemenid Empire. Within the satrapy itself, the Achaemenid king Darius granted to the tyrant Histiaeus of Miletus the district of Myrcinus on the Strymon's east bank until Megabazus persuaded him to recall Histiaeus after he returned to Asia Minor, after which the Thracian tribe of the Edoni retook control of Myrcinus. The new satrapy, once created, was named , derived from Scythian the name , which was the self-designation of the Scythians who inhabited the northern parts of the satrapy. Otanes then proceeded to capture Byzantium, Chalcedon, Antandrus, Lamponeia, Imbros, and Lemnos for the Achaemenid Empire.

The area included within the satrapy of  included both the Aegean coast of Thrace, as well as its Pontic coast till the Danube. In the interior, the Western border of the satrapy consisted of the Axius river and the Belasica-Pirin-Rila mountain ranges till the site of modern-day Kostenets. The importance of this satrapy rested in that it contained the Hebros river, where a route in the river valley connected the permanent Persian settlement of Doriscus with the Aegean coast, as well as with the port-cities of Apollonia, Mesembria and Odessos on the Black Sea, and with the central Thracian plain, which gave this region an important strategic value. Persian sources describe the province as being populated by three groups: the Saka Paradraya ("Saka beyond the sea", the Persian term for all Scythian peoples to the north of the Caspian and Black Seas ); the  themselves (most likely the Thracian tribes), and Yauna Takabara. The latter term, which translates as "Ionians with shield-like hats", is believed to refer to Macedonians. The three ethnicities (Saka, Macedonian, Thracian) enrolled in the Achaemenid army, as shown in the Imperial tomb reliefs of Naqsh-e Rostam, and participated in the Second Persian invasion of Greece on the Achaemenid side.

When Achaemenid control over its European possessions collapsed once the Ionian Revolt started, the Thracians did not help the Greek rebels, and they instead saw Achaemenid rule as more favourable because the latter had treated the Thracians with favour and even given them more land, and also because they realised that Achaemenid rule was a bulwark against Greek expansion and Scythian attacks. During the revolt, Aristagoras of Miletus captured Myrcinus from the Edones and died trying to attack another Thracian city.

Mardonius was however attacked at night by the Bryges in the area of Lake Doiran and modern-day Valandovo, but he was able to defeat and submit them as well. Herodotus's list of tribes who provided the Achaemenid army with soldiers included Thracians from both the coast and from the central Thracian plain, attesting that Mardonius's campaign had reconquered all the Thracian areas which were under Achaemenid rule before the Ionian Revolt.

The Thracians kept on sending supplies to the governor of Eion when the Greeks besieged it. When the city fell to the Greeks in 475 BC, Cimon gave its land to Athens for colonisation. Although Athens was now in control of the Aegean Sea and the Hellespont following the defeat of the Persian invasion, the Persians were still able to control the southern coast of Thrace from a base in central Thrace and with the support of the Thracians. Thanks to the Thracians co-operating with the Persians by sending supplies and military reinforcements down the Hebrus river route, Achaemenid authority in central Thrace lasted until around 465 BC, and the governor Mascames managed to resist many Greek attacks in Doriscus until then.

Around this time, Teres I, the king of the Odrysae tribe, in whose territory the Hebrus flowed, was starting to organise the rise of his kingdom into a powerful state. With the end of Achaemenid power in the Balkans, the Thracian Odrysian kingdom, the kingdom of Macedonia, and the Athenian thalassocracy filled the ensuing power vacuum and formed their own spheres of influence in the area.

Odrysian Kingdom

The Odrysian Kingdom was a state union of over 40 Thracian tribes and 22 kingdoms that existed between the 5th century BC and the 1st century AD. It consisted mainly of present-day Bulgaria, spreading to parts of Southeastern Romania (Northern Dobruja), parts of Northern Greece and parts of modern-day European Turkey.

By the fifth century BC, the Thracian population was large enough that Herodotus called them the second-most numerous people in the part of the world known by him (after the Indians), and potentially the most powerful, if not for their lack of unity. The Thracians in classical times were broken up into a large number of groups and tribes, though a number of powerful Thracian states were organized, the most important being the Odrysian kingdom of Thrace, and also the short lived Dacian kingdom of Burebista. The peltast, a type of soldier of this period, probably originated in Thrace.

During this period, a subculture of celibate ascetics called the "ctistae" lived in Thrace, where they served as philosophers, priests and prophets.

Macedonian Thrace
During this period, contacts between the Thracians and Classical Greece intensified.

After the Persians withdrew from Europe and before the expansion of the Kingdom of Macedon, Thrace was divided into three regions (east, central, and west). A notable ruler of the East Thracians was Cersobleptes, who attempted to expand his authority over many of the Thracian tribes. He was eventually defeated by the Macedonians.

The Thracians were typically not city-builders and their only polis was Seuthopolis.

The conquest of the southern part of Thrace by Philip II of Macedon in the fourth century BC made the Odrysian kingdom extinct for several years. After the kingdom was reestablished, it was a vassal state of Macedon for several decades under generals such as Lysimachus of the Diadochi.

In 279 BC, Celtic Gauls advanced into Macedonia, southern Greece and Thrace. They were soon forced out of Macedonia and southern Greece, but they remained in Thrace until the end of the third century BC. From Thrace, three Celtic tribes advanced into Anatolia and established the kingdom of Galatia.

In western parts of Moesia, Celts (Scordisci) and Thracians lived alongside each other, as evident from the archaeological findings of pits and treasures, spanning from the third century BC to the first century BC.

Roman Thrace
During the Macedonian Wars, conflict between Rome and Thrace was unavoidable. The rulers of Macedonia were weak, and Thracian tribal authority resurged. But after the Battle of Pydna in 168 BC, Roman authority over Macedonia seemed inevitable, and the governance of Thrace passed to Rome.

Initially, Thracians and Macedonians revolted against Roman rule. For example, the revolt of Andriscus, in 149 BC, drew the bulk of its support from Thrace. Incursions by local tribes into Macedonia continued for many years, though a few tribes, such as the Deneletae and the Bessi, willingly allied with Rome.

After the Third Macedonian War, Thrace acknowledged Roman authority. The client state of Thracia comprised several tribes.

Roman rule

The next century and a half saw the slow development of Thracia into a permanent Roman client state. The Sapaei tribe came to the forefront initially under the rule of Rhascuporis. He was known to have granted assistance to both Pompey and Caesar, and later supported the Republican armies against Mark Antony and Octavian in the final days of the Republic.

The heirs of Rhascuporis became as deeply enmeshed in political scandal and murder as were their Roman masters. A series of royal assassinations altered the ruling landscape for several years in the early Roman imperial period. Various factions took control with the support of the Roman Emperor. The turmoil would eventually end with one final assassination.

After Rhoemetalces III of the Thracian Kingdom of Sapes was murdered in AD 46 by his wife, Thracia was incorporated as an official Roman province to be governed by Procurators, and later Praetorian prefects. The central governing authority of Rome was in Perinthus, but regions within the province were under the command of military subordinates to the governor. The lack of large urban centers made Thracia a difficult place to manage, but eventually the province flourished under Roman rule. However, Romanization was not attempted in the province of Thracia. The Balkan Sprachbund does not support Hellenization.

Roman authority in Thracia rested mainly with the legions stationed in Moesia. The rural nature of Thracia's populations, and distance from Roman authority, certainly inspired local troops to support Moesia's legions. Over the next few centuries, the province was periodically and increasingly attacked by migrating Germanic tribes. The reign of Justinian saw the construction of over 100 legionary fortresses to supplement the defense.

Barbarians
Thracians were regarded by other peoples as warlike, ferocious, bloodthirsty, and barbarian. They were seen as "barbarians" by ancient Greeks and Romans. Plato in his Republic groups them with the Scythians, calling them extravagant and high spirited; and his Laws portrays them as a warlike nation, grouping them with Celts, Persians, Scythians, Iberians and Carthaginians. Polybius wrote of Cotys's sober and gentle character being unlike that of most Thracians. Tacitus in his Annals writes of them being wild, savage and impatient, disobedient even to their own kings. The Thracians have been said to have "tattooed their bodies, obtained their wives by purchase, and often sold their children." Victor Duruy further notes that they "considered husbandry unworthy of a warrior, and knew no source of gain but war and theft," and that they practiced human sacrifice, which has been confirmed by archaeological evidence.

Polyaenus and Strabo write how the Thracians broke their pacts of truce with trickery. The Thracians struck their weapons against each other before battle, "in the Thracian manner," as Polyaneus testifies. Diegylis was considered one of the most bloodthirsty chieftains by Diodorus Siculus. An Athenian club for lawless youths was named after the Triballi.

According to ancient Roman sources, the Dii were responsible for the worst atrocities of the Peloponnesian War, killing every living thing, including children and dogs in Tanagra and Mycalessos. Thracians would impale Roman heads on their spears and rhomphaias such as in the Kallinikos skirmish at 171 BC.

Herodotus writes that "they sell their children and let their maidens commerce with whatever men they please".

The accuracy and impartiality of these descriptions have been called into question in modern times, given the seeming embellishments in Herodotus's histories, for one. Strabo treated the Thracians as barbarians, and held that they spoke the same language as the Getae. Archaeologists have attempted to piece together a fuller understanding of Thracian culture through study of their artifacts.

Aftermath and legacy

The ancient languages of these people and their cultural influence were highly reduced due to the repeated invasions of the Balkans by Romans, Celts, Huns, Goths, Scythians, Sarmatians and Slavs, accompanied by, hellenization, romanization and later slavicisation. However, the Thracians as a group only disappeared in the Early Middle Ages. Towards the end of the 4th century, Nicetas the Bishop of Remesiana brought the gospel to "those mountain wolves", the Bessi. Reportedly his mission was successful, and the worship of Dionysus and other Thracian gods was eventually replaced by Christianity. In 570, Antoninus Placentius said that in the valleys of Mount Sinai there was a monastery in which the monks spoke Greek, Latin, Syriac, Egyptian and Bessian. The origin of the monasteries is explained in a medieval hagiography written by Simeon Metaphrastes, in Vita Sancti Theodosii Coenobiarchae in which he wrote that Theodosius the Cenobiarch founded on the shore of the Dead Sea a monastery with four churches, in each being spoken a different language, among which Bessian was found. The place where the monasteries were founded was called "Cutila", which may be a Thracian name. The further fate of the Thracians is a matter of dispute. Gottfried Schramm derived the Albanians from the Christian Bessi, or Bessians, an early Thracian people who were pushed westwards into Albania. However, from a linguistic point of view it emerges that the Thracian-Bessian hypothesis of the origin of Albanian should be rejected, since only very little comparative linguistic material is available (the Thracian is attested only marginally, while the Bessian is completely unknown), but at the same time the individual phonetic history of Albanian and Thracian clearly indicates a very different sound development that cannot be considered as the result of one language. Furthermore, the Christian vocabulary of Albanian is mainly Latin, which speaks against the construct of a "Thracian-Bessian church language". Most probably the remnants of the Thracians were assimilated into the Roman and later in the Byzantine society and became part of the ancestral groups of the modern Southeastern Europeans.

Culture

Language

Religion

One notable cult that existed in Thrace, Moesia and Scythia Minor was that of the "Thracian horseman", also known as the "Thracian Heros", at Odessos (near Varna) known by a Thracian name as Heros Karabazmos, a god of the underworld, who was usually depicted on funeral statues as a horseman slaying a beast with a spear. Dacians had a monotheistic religion based on the god Zalmoxis. The supreme Balkan thunder god Perkon was part of the Thracian pantheon, although cults of Orpheus and Zalmoxis likely overshadowed his.

Some think that the Greek god Dionysus evolved from the Thracian god Sabazios.

Marriage
The Thracians were polygamous. Menander puts it: "All Thracians, especially us and the Getae, are not much abstaining, because no one takes less than ten, eleven, twelve wives, some even more. If one dies and has only four or five wives he is called ill-fated, unhappy and unmarried." According to Herodotus virginity among women was not valued, and unmarried Thracian women could have sex with any man they wished to. There were men perceived as holy Thracians, who lived without women and were called "ktisti". In myth Orpheus became attracted to men after the death of Eurydice and is thought of as the establisher of homosexuality among Thracian men. Because he advocated love between men and turning away from loving women he was killed by the Bistones women.

Warfare

The Thracians were a warrior people, known as both horsemen and lightly armed skirmishers with javelins. Thracian peltasts had a notable influence in Ancient Greece.

The history of Thracian warfare spans from c. 10th century BC up to the 1st century AD in the region defined by Ancient Greek and Latin historians as Thrace. It concerns the armed conflicts of the Thracian tribes and their kingdoms in the Balkans and in the Dacian territories. Emperor Traianus, also known as Trajan, conquered Dacia after two wars in the 2nd century AD. The wars ended with the occupation of the fortress of Sarmisegetusa and the death of the king Decebalus. Besides conflicts between Thracians and neighboring nations and tribes, numerous wars were recorded among Thracian tribes too.

Physical appearance

Several Thracian graves or tombstones have the name Rufus inscribed on them, meaning "redhead" – a common name given to people with red hair which led to associating the name with slaves when the Romans enslaved this particular group. Ancient Greek artwork often depicts Thracians as redheads. Rhesus of Thrace, a mythological Thracian king, was so named because of his red hair and is depicted on Greek pottery as having red hair and a red beard.
Ancient Greek writers also described the Thracians as red-haired. A fragment by the Greek poet Xenophanes describes the Thracians as blue-eyed and red haired:

Bacchylides described Theseus as wearing a hat with red hair, which classicists believe was Thracian in origin. Other ancient writers who described the hair of the Thracians as red include Hecataeus of Miletus, Galen, Clement of Alexandria, and Julius Firmicus Maternus.

Nevertheless, academic studies have concluded that people often had different physical features from those described by primary sources. Ancient authors described as red-haired several groups of people. They claimed that all Slavs had red hair, and likewise described the Scythians as red haired. According to Beth Cohen, Thracians had "the same dark hair and the same facial features as the Ancient Greeks." However, Aris N. Poulianos states that Thracians, like modern Bulgarians, belonged mainly to the Aegean anthropological type.

Notable people
This is a list of historically important personalities being entirely or partly of Thracian ancestry:
Orpheus, mythological figure considered chief among poets and musicians; king of the Thracian tribe of Cicones
Spartacus, Thracian gladiator who led a large slave uprising in Southern Italy in 73–71 BC and defeated several Roman legions in what is known as the Third Servile War
Amadocus, Thracian King, the Amadok Point was named after him
Teres I, Thracian King who united many tribes of Thrace under the banner of the Odrysian state
Seuthes I
Seuthes II
Seuthes III
Rhesus of Thrace
Cotys I
Sitalces, King of the Odrysian state; an ally of the Athenians during the Peloponnesian War
Burebista, King of Dacia
Decebalus, King of Dacia
Maximinus Thrax, Roman Emperor from 235 to 238.
Aureolus, Roman military commander
Galerius, Roman Emperor from 305 to 311; born to a Thracian father and Dacian mother
Licinius, Roman Emperor from 308 to 324
Maximinus Daia or Maximinus Daza, Roman Emperor from 308 to 313
Justin I, Eastern Roman Emperor and founder of the Justinian dynasty
Justinian the Great, Eastern Roman Emperor; either Illyrian or Thracian, born in Dardania 
Belisarius, Eastern Roman general of reputed Illyrian or Thracian origin
Marcian, Eastern Roman Emperor from 450 to 457; either Illyrian or Thracian
Leo I the Thracian, Eastern Roman Emperor from 457 to 474
Bouzes or Buzes, Eastern Roman general active during the reign of Justinian the Great (r. 527–565)
Coutzes or Cutzes, general of the Byzantine Empire during the reign of Emperor Justinian I

Thracology

Archaeology 
 
The branch of science that studies the ancient Thracians and Thrace is called Thracology. Archaeological research on the Thracian culture started in the 20th century, especially after World War II, mainly in 
southern Bulgaria. As a result of intensive excavations in the 1960s and 1970s a number of Thracian tombs and sanctuaries were discovered. Most significant among them are: the Tomb of Sveshtari, the Tomb of Kazanlak, Tatul, Seuthopolis, Perperikon the Tomb of Aleksandrovo in Bulgaria and  Sarmizegetusa in Romania and others.

Also a large number of elaborately crafted gold and silver treasure sets from the 5th and 4th century BC were unearthed. In the following decades, those were exhibited in museums around the world, thus calling attention to ancient Thracian culture. Since the year 2000, Bulgarian archaeologist Georgi Kitov has made discoveries in Central Bulgaria, in an area now known as  "The Valley of the Thracian Kings". The residence of the Odrysian kings was found in Starosel in the Sredna Gora mountains. A 1922 Bulgarian study claimed that there were at least 6,269 necropolises in Bulgaria.

Panagyurishte Treasure
Rogozen Treasure
Valchitran Treasure
Borovo Treasure

Genetics

A genetic study published in Scientific Reports in April 2019 examined the mtDNA of 25 Thracian remains in Bulgaria from the 3rd and 2nd millennia BC. They were found to harbor a mixture of ancestry from Western Steppe Herders (WSHs) and Early European Farmers (EEFs), supporting the idea that the Balkan region was a link between Eastern Europe and the Mediterranean.

Gallery

See also

 Akrokomai
 Andronovo culture
 Bosporan Kingdom
 Cimmerians
 Dacia and Dacians
 Illyria and Illyrians
 List of rulers of Thrace and Dacia
 List of Thracian tribes
 List of ancient Daco-Thracian peoples and tribes
 Odrysian kingdom
 Orphism (religion)
 Paeonia (kingdom)
 Scythians
 Thracian warfare
 Thraco-Cimmerian
 Thraco-Dacian
 Thraco-Illyrian
 Tiras

References

Sources

 
 

Best, Jan and De Vries, Nanny. Thracians and Mycenaeans. Boston, MA: E.J. Brill Academic Publishers, 1989. .

Further reading

 The Yurta-Stroyno Archaeological Project. Studies on the Roman Rural Settlement in Thrace. P. Tušlová – B. Weissová – S. Bakardzhiev (eds.). Prague: Charles University, Faculty of Arts, 2022. ISBN 978-80-7671-068‑9 (print), ISBN 978-80-7671-069-6 (online: pdf)

External links

Thrace and the Thracians (700 BC to 46 AD)
 Ancient Thracians. Art, Culture, History, Treasures
Information on Ancient Thrace
video about the Thracians and Thracian warfare

 
Ancient tribes in Bulgaria
Ancient tribes in Macedonia
Ancient tribes in Romania
Ancient tribes in the Balkans
Indo-European peoples
European civilizations
Archaeological cultures in Bulgaria